Paul van Hyfte (born 19 January 1972 in Eeklo) is a Belgian former professional road bicycle racer. He is a former rider at the Danish professional cycling team,  from 2002 to 2003. He left the team after 2003 and joined a Belgian team, Vlaanderen-T Interim for his final season in 2004.

In the 2015 Tour of Flanders, van Hyfte was named as driving a Shimano neutral service vehicle which rear-ended the  team car as it slowed to attend to Sylvain Chavanel.

Major results

1989
 3rd Time trial, National Junior Road Championships
1990
 National Junior Road Championships
1st  Road race
2nd Time trial
1995
 8th Grand Prix Cerami
1996
 9th Grand Prix de Wallonie
1997
 6th GP Stad Zottegem
 6th Overall Tour de Wallonie
 9th Overall Route du Sud
1998
 1st GP Stad Zottegem
 2nd Route Adélie
 10th HEW Cyclassics
1999
 8th Druivenkoers Overijse
2000
 5th Henk Vos Memorial
 6th Classic Haribo
 7th Overall Étoile de Bessèges
 9th Grand Prix d'Isbergues
2001
 1st Kampioenschap van Vlaanderen
 1st Schaal Sels
 3rd Classic Haribo
 4th Overall Circuit Franco-Belge
 4th Overall Ronde van Nederland
 8th Omloop Het Volk
 9th Grand Prix d'Isbergues
2002
 6th Overall Tour Down Under
 9th Grand Prix d'Ouverture La Marseillaise
2003
 8th Overall Sachsen-Tour
2004
 2nd Overall Ster Elektrotoer
 5th Overall Tour de Wallonie
 8th Classic Loire Atlantique

References

External links
Trap-Friis profile (source)
Photo: https://web.archive.org/web/20110527130728/http://mishami.image.pbase.com/u12/actiefotos/upload/13886484.Img_0344.jpg

1972 births
Living people
People from Eeklo
Belgian male cyclists
Cyclists from East Flanders